Sheila Whiteley (née Astrup; 2 February 1941 – 6 June 2015) was an English musicologist known for studying popular music, such as progressive rock music and Britpop. In 1999, she was named professor and chair of popular music at the University of Salford, the first such position in Great Britain. From 1999 to 2001, she was the general secretary of the International Association for the Study of Popular Music. She held visiting professorships at the University of Aarhus in 2008, and at the University of Brighton from 2007 to 2009.

Works

References

External links
 (archived)

1941 births
2015 deaths
People from Brighton
English musicologists
Women musicologists
Academics of the University of Salford
Alumni of the Open University
People educated at Hove Grammar School